Victor Nyirenda (born 23 August 1988 in Blantyre) is a Malawian footballer, who currently plays for Berjaya Dong Nai F.C.

Career

Nyirenda began his career for ESCOM United and joined 2006 to League rival MTL Wanderers. After four years with MTL Wanderers signed in January 2010 for Rwandan club APR Kigali.

International career
He played for the Malawi national football team at 2010 African Cup of Nations.

References

1988 births
Living people
People from Blantyre
Malawian footballers
Malawi international footballers
2010 Africa Cup of Nations players
Malawian expatriate footballers
Expatriate footballers in Rwanda
APR F.C. players
Mighty Wanderers FC players
ESCOM United FC players

Association football forwards